"Red Solo Cup" is a song written by Brett Warren, Brad Warren, Brett Beavers, and Jim Beavers and recorded by American country music singer Toby Keith. It was released on October 10, 2011 as the second single from Keith’s 2011 album Clancy's Tavern. This is the only song on the album that Keith did not write or co-write. The song was featured in the Glee episode "Hold On to Sixteen". Insider ranked it as the second worst song of the 2010s decade and Toby Keith himself called it "the stupidest song I ever heard in my life." A remixed version by Johnny Mac appears on the deluxe edition of Keith's sixteenth studio album Hope on the Rocks, released the following year. It is Keith's biggest and final crossover hit to date.

Content
"Red Solo Cup" is about the Solo Cup Company's red style of plastic cups, and their common usage at parties, among other occasions. It is in the key of A major, with a primary chord pattern of A-Bm7-E-A on the verses, which are spoken-word. The final chorus modulates a whole-step upward to B major.

History
Singer-songwriter duo The Warren Brothers (Brad and Brett Warren) co-wrote "Red Solo Cup" with Brett Beavers and his brother, Jim Beavers. The four of them decided to write something that would "make us all laugh and smile." According to Brett Warren, Jim did the majority of the writing. Keith told CMT that it was "the stupidest song that I have ever heard in my life" but also "freakin' awesome."

All four writers sing backing vocals on the song. The Warren Brothers also perform acoustic guitar on it, while Jim plays bass guitar and Brett plays six-string banjo.

Music video
The music video includes cameos from Jeff Dunham (and his character Bubba J), Carrot Top, Ted Nugent, Sammy Hagar, Craig Ferguson, Geoff Peterson, Roger Clemens, Eric Church, Joe Nichols, Lance Burton, and Larry Bird among others.

It had acquired more than 600,000 views on YouTube before the album's release. The video surpassed 66 million views as of February 2023.

Chart performance

Year-end charts

Certifications

Other versions and parodies
German singer and entertainer Stefan Raab made up his own version of the song and changed the location of the song and its lyrics to a pub in Cologne. The whole song is sung in the typical dialect of Cologne.
 American parody artist Cledus T. Judd released a parody of "Red Solo Cup" titled "Double D Cups" on his 2012 album "Parodyziac!!".

References

External links

2011 singles
2011 songs
Country rap songs
Music videos directed by Michael Salomon
Novelty songs
Songs written by Brett Beavers
Songs written by Jim Beavers
Songs written by the Warren Brothers
Show Dog-Universal Music singles
Songs about alcohol
Toby Keith songs